Rohinton Mistry  (born 1952) is an Indian-born Canadian writer. He has been the recipient of many awards including the Neustadt International Prize for Literature in 2012. Each of his first three novels were shortlisted for the Booker Prize. His novels to date have been set in India, told from the perspective of Parsis, and explore themes of family life, poverty, discrimination, and the corrupting influence of society.

Early life and education
Rohinton Mistry was born in Bombay, India, to a Parsi family. His brother is the playwright and author Cyrus Mistry. He earned a BA in Mathematics and Economics from St. Xavier's College, Bombay.

He emigrated to Canada with his wife-to-be Freny Elavia in 1975 and they married shortly afterwards. He worked in a bank for a while, before returning to academia at the University of Toronto where he obtained a BA in English and Philosophy.

Career

While attending the University of Toronto (Woodsworth College) he became the first to win two Hart House literary prizes for stories published in the Hart House Review, and Canadian Fiction Magazines annual Contributor's Prize for 1985.

Three years later, Penguin Books Canada published his collection of 11 short stories, Tales from Firozsha Baag. It was later published in the United States as Swimming Lessons and Other Stories from Firozsha Baag. The book consists of 11 stories set within an apartment complex in modern-day Bombay. This volume contains the oft-anthologized story, "Swimming Lessons".

His second book, the novel Such a Long Journey, was published in 1991. It won the Governor General's Award, the Commonwealth Writers Prize for Best Book, and the W.H. Smith/Books in Canada First Novel Award. It was shortlisted for the Booker Prize and for the Trillium Award. It has been translated into German, Swedish, Norwegian, Danish and Japanese. It was adapted for the 1998 film Such a Long Journey. The content of the book caused a controversy at Mumbai University in 2010 due to language used against Bal Thackeray, leader of Shiv Sena, a political party from Maharashtra, as well as some remarks about Maharashtrians. The book was prescribed for the second year Bachelor of Arts (English) in 2007–08 as an optional text, according to University sources. Later, Dr. Rajan Welukar, University of Mumbai's Vice-Chancellor (V-C) used emergency powers in the Maharashtra Universities Act, 1994, to withdraw the book from the syllabus.

His third book, and second novel, A Fine Balance (1995), won the second annual Giller Prize in 1995, and the Los Angeles Times Book Prize for Fiction in 1996. It was selected for Oprah's Book Club in November 2001. It won the 1996 Commonwealth Writers Prize and was shortlisted for the 1996 Booker prize.

Family Matters (2002) is a consideration of the difficulties that come with ageing, to which topic Mistry returned in 2008 with the short fiction The Scream (published as a separate volume, in support of World Literacy of Canada, with illustrations by Tony Urquhart). Mistry's literary papers are housed at the Clara Thomas Archives at York University.

In 2002, Mistry cancelled his United States book tour for his novel Family Matters after he and his wife were targeted by security agents at every airport.

Awards and recognition
1983 – Hart House Literary Contest, "One Sunday"
1984 – Hart House Literary Contest, "Auspicious Occasion"
1985 – Annual Contributors' Prize, Canadian Fiction Magazine
1991 – Booker Prize, shortlist, Such a Long Journey
1991 – Governor General's Award, Such a Long Journey
1991 – Commonwealth Writers Prize, Such a Long Journey
1991 – W.H. Smith/Books in Canada First Novel Award, Such a Long Journey
1991 – Trillium Award, Such a Long Journey
1995 – Giller Prize, A Fine Balance
1995 – Los Angeles Times Book Prize for Fiction, A Fine Balance
1996 – Commonwealth Writers Prize, A Fine Balance
1996 – Booker Prize, shortlist, A Fine Balance
2002 – Booker Prize, shortlist, Family Matters
2002 – James Tait Black Memorial Prize, shortlist Family Matters
2004 – International Dublin Literary Award, shortlist, Family Matters
2012 – Neustadt International Prize for Literature
2015- Appointed as a Member of the Order of Canada
 Brampton Arts Walk of Fame, Brampton, Ontario

Selected works

Novels
Such a Long Journey (1991)
A Fine Balance (1995)
Family Matters (2002)

Short stories and chapbooks
Tales from Firozsha Baag (1987), also published as Swimming Lessons and Other Stories from Firozsha Baag (1989)
Searching for Stevenson (1994)
The Scream (2006)

See also
 List of Canadian writers
 List of Indian writers

References

External links
Rohinton Mistry archives held at the Clara Thomas Archives and Special Collections, York University Libraries, Toronto, Ontario
 Rohinton Mistry biographical and critical information by James Proctor

1952 births
Canadian writers of Asian descent
Canadian male novelists
Governor General's Award-winning fiction writers
Indian emigrants to Canada
English-language writers from India
Living people
Members of the Order of Canada
Parsi people from Mumbai
People from Brampton
University of Toronto alumni
Indian male novelists
Parsi writers
20th-century Indian novelists
Writers from Mumbai
Novelists from Maharashtra
21st-century Indian novelists
20th-century Canadian novelists
21st-century Canadian novelists
20th-century Canadian male writers
21st-century Canadian male writers
Parsi people
Gujarati people
Writers from Gujarat
Canadian people of Parsi descent
Amazon.ca First Novel Award winners